David Holmes (16 November 1843 – 14 January 1906) was a British trade unionist.

Born in Manchester, Holmes worked as a weaver from the age of 8. When he was ten, he ran away from home to live with an uncle in Padiham. He continued weaving but also received some education at the local Unitarian chapel.

Early in the 1860s, Holmes married and the couple moved to Burnley. There, he was a leading founder member of the Burnley Weavers' Association. In 1871, he was elected as its president and served until his death. He focused his activities on promoting collective bargaining for wages; he opposed the eight-hour day and supported child labour, as he believed that they contributed to the weavers' comparative advantage over workers elsewhere.

Despite his moderation, he was blacklisted by employers and instead took work as a rag-and-bone man to support his family, alongside his union role. In 1878, he led the union in part of a major but unsuccessful county-wide strike. That led, in 1884, to the creation of the Northern Counties Amalgamated Association of Weavers, with Holmes as president.

Holmes was a member of the Parliamentary Committee of the Trades Union Congress (TUC), where he opposed the new unions, which organised unskilled labour, and attended various international conferences representing the organisation.

Politically, Holmes was a supporter of the Liberal Party, and he served on Burnley Town Council. He was an opponent of socialism and of the Labour Party when it emerged.  However, his protégé and designated successor, David Shackleton, would join the Labour Party.

Holmes stood down from the TUC in 1902 and became less active elsewhere.

References

1843 births
1906 deaths
Councillors in Lancashire
Presidents of the Amalgamated Weavers' Association
Presidents of the United Textile Factory Workers' Association
Liberal-Labour (UK) politicians
Members of the Parliamentary Committee of the Trades Union Congress
Trade unionists from Manchester